Baharestan is the name given to the historic Iranian parliament building, inaugurated in 1906 (see Persian Constitutional Revolution). It was adopted from the name of the neighborhood and a small palace that adorned the place. 

The Baharestan remained the location for the lower house of the Iranian parliament (the Senate had moved to a new building in central Tehran) until the Iranian Revolution in 1979. After the revolution, the parliament became unicameral and met at the Senate building, and to a newly built building in Baharestan in 2004.

See also 
 2017 Tehran attacks

References

Buildings and structures in Tehran
National Consultative Assembly